Norape truncata is a moth of the family Megalopygidae. It was described by Walter Hopp in 1927. It is found in Venezuela, Peru and Colombia.

Subspecies
Norape truncata truncata (Venezuela)
Norape truncata cavata Hopp, 1927 (Peru)
Norape truncata hastata Hopp, 1927 (Colombia)

References

Moths described in 1927
Megalopygidae